This is a list of finalists for the 1998 Archibald Prize for portraiture (listed is Artist – Title).

    Rick Amor – Portrait of Bruce Pollard
 Danelle Bergstrom – JF-S transposition
    Steve Bowden – Images in the mirror
    Warren Breninger – Self-portrait – January 1998
    Judy Cassab – John Wolseley
    Robert Clinch – Sir William Dargie
    Kevin Connor – Portrait of Jan Senbergs, painter
 Adam Cullen – Portrait of Frank Moorhouse AM (author)
    Paula Dawson – Sleeping man (Barry Jones politician)
    Graham Fransella – Self-portrait
    Joe Furlonger – Self-portrait – artist painting landscape
 Robert Hannaford – Paul Keating (Former Prime Minister)
    Robert Hannaford – Rolf Prince (Winner: People's Choice Award 1998)
    Nicholas Harding – Margaret Olley 1998
    He Huang – Artist Daniel H Kojta
 Bill Leak – Gough Whitlam (Former Prime Minister)
 Kerrie Lester – Self-portrait as a bridesmaid (Winner: Packing Room Prize 1998)
    Mathew Lynn – Guan Wei
    Lewis Miller – Portrait of Allan Mitelman no 3 (Winner: Archibald Prize 1998) {Image)
    Henry Mulholland – Peter Shortland and Vince
    David Naseby – Les Murray (poet)
    Angus Nivison – Portrait of Chandler Coventry
    John Peart – Margaret Tuckson
 Jenny Sages – Nobody's daughter – Meme Thorne
    Jiawei Shen – Eyewitness (portrait of George Gittoes AM, artist) (Image)
    Rosemary Valadon – The dove and the cross – portrait of Rev Rod Pattenden
    Dick Watkins – Rollin Schlicht
    Bryan Westwood – Donald Horne AO
    Salvatore Zofrea – Ken Borda

See also
Previous year: List of Archibald Prize 1997 finalists
Next year: List of Archibald Prize 1999 finalists
List of Archibald Prize winners

References

External links
Archibald Prize 1998 finalists official website

1998
Archibald Prize 1998
Archibald Prize 1998
Archibald
Arch